Hassan Zai is a town and union council in Charsadda District of Khyber-Pakhtunkhwa. It is located at 34°16'24N 71°36'24E and has an altitude of 327 metres (1076 feet).

References

Union councils of Charsadda District